Austin Vince is best known for his long distance adventure motorcycle expeditions: twice round the world as part of the Mondo Enduro and Terra Circa trips, which were both produced as TV documentaries.

As well as presenting the Mondo Enduro and co-presenting the Terra Circa TV programmes, Vince has also written and presented the Routes series on Discovery Channel. Latterly he played the maths teacher in the first two seasons of Channel 4's That'll Teach 'Em and has in the past taught at St. Johns Northwood as a maths teacher. He has also served in the Royal Engineers.

Vince attended the private Mill Hill School in North London then was sponsored through university by the army but became a pacifist while there and had to pay them to get out. After university, he returned to Mill Hill as a teacher and used to teach at St. Johns School in Northwood. He is married to long distance female motorcyclist Lois Pryce, who has completed several notable expeditions of her own. He returned for a second stint at St Johns School in Northwood before leaving in 2016 to pursue his passion for motorcycle adventure trips (mini mondos) in the Pyrenees.

Books
 Vince, Austin; Bloom, Louis et al. (2006) Mondo Enduro. Ripping Yarns.com. .

References

External links
 
 MondoEnduro.com — Official website of the Mondo Enduro expedition.
 LoisOnTheLoose.com — Website of Lois Pryce.

Living people
Year of birth missing (living people)
Motorcycling mass media people
People educated at Mill Hill School
Long-distance motorcycle riders
World record holders
World record setters in motorcycling